Speedunnodu  is a 2016 Indian Telugu romantic comedy film directed by Bhimaneni Srinivasa Rao. It is produced by Bheemineni Sunitha under her production company Good Will Cinema, Speedunnodu features Bellamkonda Sreenivas, Sonarika Bhadoria, and Prakash Raj in the lead roles while Kabir Duhan Singh plays the antagonist. Production commenced in April 2015, and the film's principal photography was completed by January 2016. The film released worldwide on 5 February 2016. This film is a remake of the 2012 Tamil movie Sundarapandian.

Plot
Sobhan is the son of the president of Rapthaadu, Veerabhadrappa, who leads a happy life and spends all his time with his friends. Sobhan ensures that he is always of some help to his friends. He goes to any extent to help his friends. He tries to help his friends woo Vasanthi, the daughter of Ramachandrappa, after she rejected his love proposal when she was in tenth. As it happens, she falls for Sobhan again by seeing his deeds to help his friend.  He, too, reciprocates, but trouble comes as Vasanthi's father fixes her marriage with his relative Jagan. A murder happens, and the blame falls on Sobhan. Things get further complicated when Shobhan and Vasanthi's parents turning to be rivals.

Cast

Bellamkonda Sreenivas as Sobhan
Sonarika Bhadoria as Vasanti
Prakash Raj as Veerabhadrappa (Sobhan's father) 
Rao Ramesh as Ramachandrappa (Vasanti's father) 
Pavitra Lokesh as Lakshmi
Pragathi as Vasanti's mother
Ali as Wifi Vaikuntam
Kabir Duhan Singh as Jagan
Posani Krishna Murali as Krishnappa
Pruthviraj as Sobhan's brother-in-law 
Srinivasa Reddy as Suri
Madhunandan as Giri
Chaitanya Krishna as Madhan
Satya as Babu
Jhansi as Vasanti's aunt
Vidyullekha Raman as Vasanti's friend
Shakalaka Shankar as Qadir
Raghu Karumanchi
Tamannaah (item number) Bachelor Babu

Production
The film was launched officially in April 2015. Sonarika Bhadoria was signed in as a lead actress in May 2015. 

Later in last October 2015, popular actress Tamannaah was signed in to make a (special appearance) in a song. Filming of this song was completed by mid November 2015 and it was reported that she charged half of her remuneration to appear in the movie. The film's title was announced as Speedunnodu in December 2015.

Music
The audio of the movie was released on 22 January 2016.

Release
In January 2016, Sreenivas announced the film's release date as 5 February 2016 in a press meet.

Reception 

The film received mixed critical response.

References

External links

2016 films
2010s masala films
2010s Telugu-language films
Telugu remakes of Tamil films
Indian romantic action films
Films shot in Hyderabad, India
Films shot in Switzerland
Films shot at Ramoji Film City
Films directed by Bhimaneni Srinivasa Rao
2016 action films